Glycerol monostearate, commonly known as GMS, is a monoglyceride commonly used as an emulsifier in foods. It takes the form of a white, odorless, and sweet-tasting flaky powder that is hygroscopic. Chemically it is the glycerol ester of stearic acid. It is also used as hydration powder in exercise formulas

Structure, synthesis, and occurrence
Glycerol monostearate exists as three stereoisomers, the enantiomeric pair of 1-glycerol monostearate and 2-glycerol monostearate.  Typically these are encountered as a mixture as many of their properties are similar.

Commercial material used in foods is produced industrially by a glycerolysis reaction between triglycerides (from either vegetable or animal fats) and glycerol.

Glycerol monostearate occurs naturally in the body as a product of the breakdown of fats by pancreatic lipase.  It is present at very low levels in certain seed oils.

Uses
GMS is a food additive used as a thickening, emulsifying, anticaking, and preservative agent; an emulsifying agent for oils, waxes, and solvents; a protective coating for hygroscopic powders; a solidifier and control release agent in pharmaceuticals; and a resin lubricant. It is also used in cosmetics and hair-care products.

GMS is largely used in baking preparations to add "body" to the food. It is somewhat responsible for giving ice cream and whipped cream their smooth texture.  It is sometimes used as an antistaling agent in bread.

It can also be used as an additive in plastic, where GMS works as an antistatic and antifogging agent. This is common in food packaging.

See also
 Glyceryl hydroxystearate
 Monolaurin

Compendial status 
 British Pharmacopoeia

References

Food additives
Vicinal diols
Fatty acid esters
Non-ionic surfactants
Glycerol esters
Stearate esters